"La Pachanga" is a 1959 song by Eduardo Davidson, which is considered the classic example of the pachanga genre. The song was premiered by the Charanga band of the flautist Melquiades Fundora in Havana. The lyrics include an invitation to the dance: "Señores que pachanga, me voy con la pachanga. Ay mamita que'pachanga, me voy con la pachanga."

Versions
Genie Pace, Capitol Records, 1961
Hugo and Luigi and their children's chorus, 1961
Audrey Arno in German, Decca Records, 1961
Celia Cruz, album Siempre Vivire, 2000

References

1959 songs
Celia Cruz songs